Hail to the Chimp  is a video game developed by Wideload Games and published by Gamecock Media Group. It was released in 2008 for the PlayStation 3 and Xbox 360.

Gameplay
Up to four players compete as anthropomorphic animals in a variety of mini-games while vying for the role of "President of the Animal Kingdom". By competing in mini-game tournaments named Primaries, the players will collect clams that make the characters stronger, and complete different objectives at the same time. The one who gets the most votes will win the election. Clams are designed to be used in several ways as an all-around currency, whether by shooting them, giving out as donations or exchanging for other things like election signs or money.

Development
Released during a United States presidential election year, the game was billed as the "Presidential Party Game" and used campaign-style advertisements meant to blend in with the U.S. presidential campaign ads that were prevalent at the time.

Reception

The game received "mixed" reviews according to the review aggregation website Metacritic.

References

External links
 Wideload official site
 

2008 video games
Party video games
PlayStation 3 games
Fictional chimpanzees
Unreal Engine games
Video games developed in the United States
Xbox 360 games
Multiplayer and single-player video games